Childhood Home is the twelfth studio album by American musician Ben Harper, released on May 6, 2014, under Prestige Folklore. It is a collaboration with his mother, Ellen Harper.

Reception
The album debuted at No. 43 on Billboard 200, and No. 3 on the Folk Albums, selling around 7,000 copies in its first week. The album has sold 23,000 copies in the United States as of March 2016.

Track listing
All tracks composed by Ben Harper; except where indicated

Charts

References

2014 albums
Ben Harper albums
Prestige Records albums